Eric Takabatake (born 9 January 1991) is a Brazilian judoka. He is a two-time gold medalist in the men's 60 kg event at the Pan American Judo Championships.

He competed in the men's 60 kg event at the 2014 World Judo Championships held in Chelyabinsk, Russia. He was eliminated in his third match by Beslan Mudranov of Russia.

In 2020, he won the gold medal in the men's 60 kg event at the Pan American Judo Championships held in Guadalajara, Mexico.

In 2021, he competed in the men's 60 kg event at the Judo World Masters held in Doha, Qatar. In June 2021, he won one of the bronze medals in the mixed team event at the 2021 World Judo Championships held in Budapest, Hungary.

He represented Brazil at the 2020 Summer Olympics in Tokyo, Japan. He was eliminated in his second match in the men's 60 kg event.

References

External links
 

Living people
1991 births
Place of birth missing (living people)
Brazilian male judoka
Judoka at the 2020 Summer Olympics
Olympic judoka of Brazil
21st-century Brazilian people